Joaquim Antônio da Silva Calado, Jr. (or Callado; Rio de Janeiro, July 11, 1848 – Rio de Janeiro, March 20, 1880) was a Brazilian composer and flautist.

Da Silva is considered one of the creators of the choro genre of music. His band,  O Choro do Callado, used an ebony flute, two guitars and a cavaquinho, and was noted for facility at improvisation. Da Silva wrote and co-authored many choros, as a new way of interpreting modinhas, lundus, waltzes and polkas. His work was an inspiration to  his friend and pupil, Viriato Figueira, and his friend and band member, the female composer Chiquinha Gonzaga.

Works

 Adelaide
 Ai, Que Gozos
 Aurora
 Characteristic Whim
 Capricious
 Carnival of 1867
 Celeste
 Choro
 The Five Goddesses
 As It Is Good
 Conceicao
 Comforter
 Cruzes, Minha Prima!
 The Affected One
 The Desired One
 Ermelinda
 Ernestina
 The Meyer Family
 Fancy for Flute
 Loving Flower
 The Flowers of the Heart
 Florinda
 Hermeneutics
 Honorata
 Iman
 Improvisation
 Isabel
 Laudelina
 Souvenir of the Wharf of Glory
 Language of the Heart
 Fanado Iris
 Characteristic Lundu
 Manuela
 Manuelita
 Maria Carlota
 Mariquinhas
 Mimosa
 I Do Not Say
 What is Good, is Good!
 Pagodeira
 Dangerous
 Bigger Polka in D
 Polucena
 Puladora
 Wanted For All
 Kerosene
 The Return of Chico Triguera
 Rosinha
 Salome
 Saturnine
 Homesickness for the Wharf of Glory
 Homesickness for Inauma
 Saudosa
 The Seducer
 Sousinha
 Sigh
 Sighs of a Maiden
 Last Sigh
 Commercial Union
 Waltz
 August Twenty-first
 June Twenty-first

References

 :pt:Joaquim Antônio da Silva Calado Portuguese Wikipedia article on Joaquim Antonio da Silva Calado Junior

1848 births
1880 deaths
Brazilian composers
Musicians from Rio de Janeiro (city)
Brazilian flautists
Choro musicians
19th-century composers